Digital amnesia may refer to:

Digital obsolescence, the loss of information due to outdated technology required to retrieve it
Google effect, the inability to remember important information because of the ease of looking online